Ardian Berisha (born 7 May 1998 in Sweden) is a Swedish footballer currently playing for Pohronie in 2. Liga.

Career
In 2018, he trialed for English second division team Leeds United after failing to make an appearance for Halmstads BK in the Swedish top flight due to injury. 

For 2018, Berisha signed for Swedish fifth division side Laholms, despite receiving offers from Trepça '89 in Kosovo.

In 2020, he signed for Senica in the Slovak top flight from Swedish fourth division outfit of Vinbergs IF.

References

External links
 Ardian Berisha at Soccerway

1998 births
Living people
Swedish people of Kosovan descent
Swedish footballers
Swedish expatriate footballers
Association football forwards
Halmstads BK players
Laholms FK players
IS Halmia players
Vinbergs IF players
KF Trepça '89 players
FK Senica players
FK Pohronie players
Football Superleague of Kosovo players
Slovak Super Liga players
2. Liga (Slovakia) players
Expatriate footballers in Kosovo
Expatriate footballers in Slovakia
Swedish expatriate sportspeople in Kosovo
Swedish expatriate sportspeople in Slovakia